The Metropolitan Detention Center, Los Angeles (MDC Los Angeles) is a United States federal prison in downtown Los Angeles, California which holds male and female inmates prior to and during court proceedings, as well as inmates serving short sentences. It is operated by the Federal Bureau of Prisons, a division of the United States Department of Justice.

History
The  prison opened in December 1988 with a cost of $36 million, making Los Angeles the fifth U.S. city with a downtown federal prison. MDC Los Angeles had a distinct design, referring to housing areas as rooms rather than cells and not using iron bars on its cell doors. It had a special design using plate glass windows, balconies, and atriums. Kim Murphy of the Los Angeles Times wrote that the building has "more the look of a downtown office building than a prison." It was the first BOP prison to completely ban smoking.

Prior to the opening of MDC Los Angeles, Federal Correctional Institution, Terminal Island housed the Los Angeles area pretrial inmates. This situation caused overcrowding at FCI Terminal Island.

The opening of MDC Los Angeles allowed prisoners whose trials are pending to be housed just two blocks from the U.S. District Courthouse, ending the time-consuming process of transporting them back and forth down the Harbor Freeway each day court is in session. The U.S. Marshal's Service saves at least $200,000 a year by not having to transport the usual 250 to 300 prisoners a week from FCI Terminal Island and the federal public defender's office saves $18,000 a year in telephone bills alone because it no longer has to rely on clients calling person-to-person collect from FCI Terminal Island.

Programs
Various services are available to inmates at MDC Los Angeles, including drug treatment and education programs, Alcoholics Anonymous and Narcotics Anonymous meetings, GED and ESL classes, and correspondence classes. Inmates may meet with a chaplain or a priest upon request.

Notable inmates (current and former)

See also

List of U.S. federal prisons
Federal Bureau of Prisons
Incarceration in the United States

References

Los Angeles
Prisons in California
Skyscrapers in Los Angeles
Skyscrapers in California
1988 establishments in California